Beatriz Salomón (October 9, 1953 – June 15, 2019) was an Argentine actress of Syrian origin, television presenter, vedette and singer.

Biography 
Born to a Syrian background family, in 1971 she won the Miss San Juan contest, famous for having worked in several movies. She started off her career as an actress with the help of comedian and actor Alberto Olmedo.

Prior to working with Olmedo, she worked as advertising model.

She died from colon cancer in Buenos Aires on June 15, 2019.

Selected filmography
 Blue Commandos (1980)
 Chocolates and champagne (1984)
 Do not Touch Button (1985
 The Black can not (1986)
 The loons on the attack (1987)
 The manosanta is loaded (1987)
 Terror Gallery (1987)
 We were so poor (1988)
 Peculiar attraction (1988)
 Shopping Center (1988)
 Mix (1988)
 Paradise Relax (House of massage) (1988)
 Punk Professor (1988)
 There is party in the tenement (1989)
 Porcel's kittens and mice (1989)
 Maximum force (1990)
 Jorge Corona and women (1990)
 Extermineitors II, revenge of the Dragon (1990)
 Enough for Me (1990)
 Beatriz Salomón en privado (1990)
 Corrupt Magazine (1991)
 Berugo love (1991)
 It rotted all (1992)
 Humor in the face (1992)
 Hard to peel' (1992)
 Hilarious, hot magazine (1993)
 Corona President (1994)
 The last Argentine virgin (1995)
 The mood of Fashion Café (1999)
 Let us vote for the humor (2000)
 Beatriz's house (2000)
 I choose to be happy (2001)
 Fascinating Night (2003)
 The clone recharged with laughter (2004)
 Humor in custody (2005)
 Dancing for a Dream3 (2006)
 Movete Cristina, movete (2008)
 Humor and Glamour'' (2010)

References

External links
 

1953 births
People from Buenos Aires
2019 deaths
Argentine people of Syrian descent
Argentine film actresses
Argentine stage actresses
Argentine television actresses
Argentine television personalities
Women television personalities
Argentine female dancers
Deaths from cancer in Argentina
Deaths from colorectal cancer
Bailando por un Sueño (Argentine TV series) participants